Dasht-e Kenar (also Romanized as Dasht-e Kenār) is a village in Tarom Rural District, in the Central District of Hajjiabad County, Hormozgan Province, Iran. At the 2006 census, its population was 14, in 5 families.

References 

Populated places in Hajjiabad County